Beth Rodd is a New Hampshire politician.

Education
Rodd earned an MA from the Hunter College School of Social Work.

Career
On November 8, 2016, Rodd was elected to the New Hampshire House of Representatives where she represents the Merrimack 6 district. She assumed office later in 2016. She is a Democrat.

Personal life
Rodd resides in Bradford, New Hampshire. She is married and has two children.

References

Living people
People from Bradford, New Hampshire
Women state legislators in New Hampshire
Democratic Party members of the New Hampshire House of Representatives
21st-century American politicians
21st-century American women politicians
Year of birth missing (living people)